The 1994–95 Terceira Divisão season was the 45th season of the competition and the 5th season of recognised fourth-tier football in Portugal.

Overview
The league was contested by 108 teams in 6 divisions of 18 teams in each.

Terceira Divisão – Série A

Terceira Divisão – Série B

Terceira Divisão – Série C

Terceira Divisão – Série D

Terceira Divisão – Série E

Terceira Divisão – Série F

Footnotes

External links
 Portuguese Division Three – footballzz.co.uk

Terceira Divisão seasons
Port
4